Citheronia is a genus of moths in the family Saturniidae. The genus was erected by Jacob Hübner in 1819.

Species
Citheronia andina Lemaire, 1971—Ecuador
Citheronia aroa Schuas, 1896—Ecuador
Citheronia azteca Schaus, 1896—Mexico and Guatemala
Citheronia beledonon Dyar, 1912—Mexico
Citheronia bellavista Draudt, 1930—Ecuador
Citheronia brissotii (Boisduval, 1868)
Citheronia equatorialis Bouvier, 1927—Ecuador
Citheronia hamifera Rothschild, 1907—Ecuador
Citheronia johnsoni Schaus, 1928
Citheronia laocoon (Cramer, 1777)
Citheronia lichyi Lemaire, 1971
Citheronia lobesis Rothschild, 1907—Mexico
Citheronia maureillei Wolfe & Herbin, 2002
Citheronia mexicana Grote & Robinson, 1867—Mexico
Citheronia phoronea (Cramer, 1779)
Citheronia pseudomexicana Lemaire, 1974—Mexico
Citheronia regalis (Fabricius, 1793)—United States
Citheronia sepulcralis Grote & Robinson, 1865—U.S.
Citheronia splendens (Druce, 1886)—U.S., Mexico
Citheronia vogleri (Weyenbergh, 1881)
Citheronia volcan Lemaire, 1982

References

External links

Ceratocampinae